Gary Barnett (born c. 1956) is an American businessman. He is the president and founder of Extell Development Company, a real estate development firm involved in residential, commercial and hospitality properties, including several high-profile buildings in Manhattan, New York.

Early life
Barnett was born Gershon Swiatycki on the Lower East Side of Manhattan. His father, Chaim Swiatycki, was a rabbi and Talmudic scholar.  He later moved to Monsey, New York. He received his Bachelor of Arts degree in math from Queens College and received a Master of Economics degree from Hunter College.

Career
Barnett began his career as a diamond trader in Antwerp, Belgium, during the 1980s. He returned to the United States in the 1990s to diversify into real estate, purchasing shopping malls and office buildings in the Midwest.

In 1994, he joined Kevin P. Maloney's Property Markets Group as a principal and made his first New York City purchase, the Belnord apartment building. In 1998, he built what would become the W Times Square. In 2003, Barnett partnered with the Carlyle Group to build The Orion, a 60-story luxury tower on 42nd Street.

Barnett is a 2011 American Institute of Architects (AIA) Heritage Ball honoree. He also received the AIA New York Chapter Award in 2011. He was ranked #6 on The Commercial Observer's Power 100 list in 2011, #2 in 2012, and #1 in 2013.

Projects
The Belnord, a landmark apartment building purchased for $18 million in 1994.
W Times Square, 1998.
Parking space site of the New York Times Building, 2001; Extell owned the space that Bruce Ratner was seeking to purchase for the office tower.  Following lengthy litigation, Barnett was forced to sell the space to New York state via eminent-domain.
The Orion, 2004; 58 story building in Hell's Kitchen, Manhattan, with financing from the Carlyle Group
Riverside South, 2005; 77 acre development purchased from Chinese investors who had been fronted by Donald Trump for $1.76 billion (a record at the time).  The purchase went through considerable litigation, including a charge that the Chinese majority owners had ignored a $3 billion offer from Colony Capital for the site in exchange for kickbacks.  The courts eventually decided in Barnett's favor.  His financing was through the Carlyle Group.
Atlantic Yards, 2005; litigation – Barnett and Ratner tangled again over ownership of the property, when Barnett offered $100 million more than Rattner and promised to build fewer buildings and not build what would become Barclays Center.  Ratner eventually prevailed.
International Gem Tower, 2011
One57, 2013; a 75-story (marketed at 90), 1,005 foot high residential building which will be New York's tallest residential buildings as well as one of the top ten tallest buildings of New York City. A  10,923-square-foot penthouse  in the unfinished building was reported to have sold for $90 million in 2012—the most ever reported paid for a New York apartment at the time.  The building received international attention in October 2012 when Hurricane Sandy flipped a 150-foot long crane steel boom over its cab and then dangled unsecured near the top of the building forcing the evacuation of several blocks of Midtown Manhattan.
Central Park Tower, the World's tallest residential building with almost $4 billion in condo sales.
The Carlton House, 2013; formerly the Helmsley Carlton House hotel. Located at 21 East 61st Street, the building was converted to 68 cooperative residences in 2013 by Beyer Blinder Belle Architects & Planners LLP, with interiors by Katherine Newman Design. In January 2013, it was announced that Thor Equities had purchased the block-long retail space for $277 million, among the highest total prices ever paid for a retail property on the street.
Invested $150,000 into SwordPen Publishers (a small-press publisher of children's stories) for a 25% stake in the company.

References

1956 births
Living people
20th-century American Jews
American real estate businesspeople
Businesspeople from New York City
Hunter College alumni
People from Monsey, New York
Queens College, City University of New York alumni
People from the Lower East Side
21st-century American Jews